Brian Cosmas Sierakowski (born 1 November 1945) is a lawyer and former Australian rules footballer.

Family
His son, David Sierakowski, also played for St Kilda and the West Coast Eagles in the AFL and his nephew, Will Sierakowski, played for Hawthorn & North Melbourne.

Football
He played as a ruckman and defender for the St Kilda Football Club playing 75 games and kicking two goals from 1964 to 1968. He played in the 1966 premiership side and was named as one of the best players in the Grand Final. Later, he played for Subiaco and represented Western Australia.

He has contributed 40 years of honorary service to the Western Australian Football Commission is his role as arbitrator, appeals tribunal member and Chairman of Community football.

Shark attack
He survived a shark attack in 1997 off Cottesloe. His damaged surf ski 'Extract of Poland' adorns the ceiling of the well-known Cicerello's Fish 'n' Chips in Fremantle.

References

External links
 
 Brian Cosmas Sierakowski, at WAFL Footy Facts''.
 1966 Grand Final page at Australian Football
 Shark attack

1945 births
Australian people of Polish descent
People educated at Xavier College
Australian rules footballers from Victoria (Australia)
Living people
St Kilda Football Club players
St Kilda Football Club Premiership players
Subiaco Football Club players
One-time VFL/AFL Premiership players